Atasemanso is a town in the Kumasi Metropolis in the Ashanti region of Ghana.

Town structure 
The town in under the jurisdiction of the Kumasi Metropolitan Assembly and is in the Nhyiaeso constituency of the Ghana parliament.

References 

Ashanti Region
Populated places in Kumasi Metropolitan Assembly